KWFX is a radio station airing a country music format licensed to Woodward, Oklahoma, broadcasting on 100.1 MHz FM. The station is owned by Classic Communications, Inc. Music is distributed by Westwood One Hot Country format.

References

External links
KWFX's official website

Country radio stations in the United States
WFX